Coleophora sudanella is a moth of the family Coleophoridae. It is found in Sudan, Saudi Arabia, Yemen and the United Arab Emirates.

References

sudanella
Invertebrates of the Arabian Peninsula
Moths described in 1916
Moths of Africa
Moths of Asia